Woman Bitten by a Serpent is an 1847 marble sculpture by Auguste Clésinger (1814–1883), now in the Musée d'Orsay in Paris.

It was commissioned by the industrialist Alfred Mosselman and first exhibited in the Paris Salon in 1847, where it and Thomas Couture's The Romans in their Decadence were the most commented-upon works. Clésinger had modelled his work on a life-cast of Mossellman's mistress, the demi-mondaine Apollonie Sabatier (1822–1890), later Charles Baudelaire's muse. The direct use of a life cast as the basis for a sculpture was highly controversial in the 19th century, particularly in its realism, such as the reproduction of the model's cellulite.  Clésinger's friend Théophile Gautier orchestrated a response to the art critics' scandalised reviews, ensuring the sculpture's great success.

At the end of 1847 Clésinger also produced a Reclining Bacchante, slightly larger than Woman so as to confute criticisms of his technical skills with marble. This was exhibited in room 4 of the Petit Palais in the 1848 Salon – Théophile Gautier wrote that it showed "pure orgiastic delirium, the disheveled Maenad tumbled at the feet of Bacchus, father of liberty and joy ... A powerful spasm of happiness contracts and raises the young woman's opulent bosom and in fact makes the sparkling breasts spring up.". He concluded by calling the work "one of the most beautiful pieces of modern sculpture". It was a major inspiration for the American painter Kehinde Wiley's 2008 Woman bitten by a serpent.

References

Marble sculptures
Sculptures of the Musée d'Orsay
1847 sculptures